A list of the tallest structures in Sweden. This list contains all types of structures.

See also
 Turning Torso
 List of tallest buildings in Sweden

External links
 https://www.aro.lfv.se/Editorial/View/1227/ES_ENR_5_4_en
 http://skyscraperpage.com/diagrams/?searchID=37735302

Sweden
Tallest structures